Charles Kuenstle (b May 3, 1936) is an American writer and actor.

He studied at Baylor University and appeared as a guest star on many American TV shows of the 1960s and 1970s, including a regular role as Sgt. Clem Garnet on Twelve O'Clock High, and many appearances in various roles on Gunsmoke.

His first writing credit was the Burt Reynolds TV movie Hunters Are for Killing.

He was one of the writers on Airport '77.

Filmography

Writer
Hunters Are for Killing (1970)
The Astronaut (1972)
Death Race (1973)
Airport '77 (1977)

Actor
 Gunsmoke (1963-1972)
 "Pa Hack's Brood" (1963) as Lonnie
 "The Wrong Man" (1966) as Wilton Kyle
 "My Father, My Son" (1966) as Bernie Jeffords
 "The Wrecker" (1967) as Luke
 "Hard Luck Henry" (1967) as Homer Haggen
 "Slocum" (1968) as 2nd Cowboy
 "The Twisted Heritage" (1969) as Elan Dagget
 "The Devil's Outpost" (1969) as Kelly
 "MacGraw" (1969) as Wilkes
 "The Lost" (1971) as Valjean Mather
 "Blind Man's Buff" (1972) as Hank McCall
 Twelve O'Clock High (1965) as Sgt. Clem Garnet

References

External links

American male television actors
American screenwriters
20th-century American male actors
1936 births
Living people